The Ysmael Steel Admirals were a basketball team that became active in the Manila Industrial and Commercial Athletic Association (MICAA) from 1958 to 1968. It was best known for its rivalry with the YCO Painters. It won numerous titles in the National Open and the MICAA. The team was owned by the Ysmael Steel Manufacturing Company, the licensed manufacturer of Admiral home appliances in the Philippines during that period.

National Open title
On January 28, 1961, Ysmael Steel ended YCO's seven-year reign in the National Open championships, winning 100-89, before 10,000 fans at the Rizal Memorial Coliseum, In that game, six Admirals scored in double figures, led by Alfonso Marquez with 22 points, Geronimo Cruz with 15, Cesar Jota with 13, and Narciso Bernardo, Cristobal Ramas and Edgardo Roque with 12 points apiece.

MICAA title
Ysmael Steel retained the MICAA crown in 1962, winning over the Painters, 69-62, in the finals clincher on May 14.  Top scorers were Narciso Bernardo and Eduardo Pacheco, the previous year, the Admirals won the title by default when YCO refused to play the third and final game at the Araneta Coliseum.

Notable players
 Engracio Arazas ✝
 Kurt Bachmann ✝
 Orlando Bauzon ✝
 Narciso Bernardo ✝
 Nicolas Carranceja
 Eddie Cruz
 Geronimo Cruz
 Romy Díaz ✝
 Felix Flores
 Manuel Jocson
 Cesar Jota ✝
 Jaime Mariano
 Alfonso Marquez ✝
 Roehl Nadurata ✝
 Eduardo Pacheco ✝
 Adriano Papa Jr. ✝
 Cristobal Ramas
 Alberto Reynoso ✝
 Eugenio Pohol Jr.
 Joaquin Rojas ✝
 Edgardo Roque
 Serafin Vida
 Romeo Yanga

Coaches
 Enrique Crame ✝
 Valentin Eduque ✝
 Felicisimo Fajardo ✝

References

External links
www.gameface.ph

Manila Industrial and Commercial Athletic Association teams
Defunct basketball teams in the Philippines
Basketball teams established in 1958
Basketball teams disestablished in 1968